Kevin Jackson (born 1964) is an American wrestler.

Kevin Jackson may also refer to:
Kevin Jackson (American football) (born 1973), American football player
Kevin Jackson (dancer) (born 1984),  Australian ballet dancer
Kevin Jackson (soccer) (born 1978), American soccer player
Sanchez (singer) (born 1964), real name Kevin Jackson
Kevin Jackson (writer) (1955–2021), British writer and filmmaker
Kevin L. Jackson, American businessperson and writer